Out Teach (formerly known as REAL School Gardens) builds outdoor learning labs in low-income schools and then spends years training teachers to use the garden to improve Math, Science, and Language Arts instruction. It is a 501(c)(3) nonprofit organization, founded in Fort Worth, Texas, with additional offices in Washington, D.C..

Programs
Out Teach works with low-income schools to get teachers using the outdoors for hands-on lessons, often referred to as garden-based learning.

In North Texas, Out Teach supports more than 100 elementary schools, ensuring that more than 100,000 children and over 4,000 educators have daily access to experiential learning through school gardens.  The organization's goals are to create outdoor classrooms to engage elementary-school children, to use nature to enhance student learning, encourage family and community involvement in schools, and to create networks of educators and partners who support garden-based learning.

The organization supports partner schools in all aspects of managing a school garden program. This support includes professional development for teachers - equipping them to take lessons in math, science, language arts and other subjects across the curriculum to the outdoor classroom - as well as guidance about installation topics, such as long- and short-range plans, budget issues, and construction work. The support also includes guidance about maintenance, sustainability and use.

History
• 1995 - Richard Rainwater's charitable foundation funds "The Prairie Project," where students in Flower Mound, Texas, restore a native grassland prairie by cleaning up an industrial dumpsite.

• 1996 - A diverse group of 33 teachers, principals and parents attends the Texas Society for Environmental Restoration Conference.

• 1996 - The Rainwater Charitable Foundation  begins supporting school gardens in the Fort Worth, Texas area

• 2003 - Stacey Hodge, a landscape designer, leads a project to convert Sam Rosen Elementary School's asphalt courtyard in Fort Worth, Texas, into a teaching garden. Moved by the garden's impact on the children and the community, she proposes the founding of REAL School Gardens.

• 2003 - The Rainwater Charitable Foundation funds the establishment of REAL School Gardens.

• 2004 - REAL School Gardens supports eight new schools in the design, installation, maintenance and use of school gardens, growing its community to 10 schools.

• 2005 - The REAL School Gardens community expands to include 14 schools in Fort Worth, Texas and surrounding communities.

• 2007 - REAL School Gardens incorporates as a 501(c)(3) nonprofit organization.

• 2007 - Jeanne McCarty is recruited from Washington, D.C. to lead the national expansion of REAL School Gardens as its executive director. She previously served with the Jane Goodall Institute's Roots & Shoots program.

• 2008 - 37 schools are committed to creating and using a school garden. With their commitment comes their ongoing participation in and support of the REAL School Gardens community.

• 2008 - Nearly 200 teachers, principals and parents attend a REAL People meeting in North Texas and are inspired by California Secretary of Education Delaine Easton's speech, "A Garden In Every School."

• 2009 - REAL School Gardens website is named winner at national ADDY Awards.

• 2009 - REAL School Gardens wins Keep Texas Beautiful's Sadie Ray Graff Award for a Civic Organization Engaged in Environmental Education

• 2009 - The organization is awarded a Motorola Grant to fund a renewable energy project for children.

• 2009 - REAL School Gardens' Co-Founder and Board Member Suzanne "Suzy" Rall Peacock dies on October 3.

• 2010 - 74 outdoor classrooms at elementary schools in North Texas are participants in the REAL School Gardens network and the organization begins offering standards based professional development for teachers to additional school districts across the U.S.

• 2015 - The organization builds its 100th outdoor classroom in Texas as well as its first learning garden in the Mid-Atlantic region.

 2018 - REAL School Gardens changed its name to Out Teach.

References
 Fort Worth Texas Magazine-The Greening of Ft Worth 
 Reuters 
 U.S. Kids Magazine 
 Children and Nature Network 
 KTVT CBS 11-Program Helps Students Grow Their First Garden 
 Univision-Programa Ayuda Estudiantes A Cultivar Su Primer Jardin Escolar 
 Take-A-Walk Books-School Gardens Grow Happy Kids In Texas 
 District Administration 
 U.S. News & World Report  
 Parade Magazine 
 NPR station KERA 
 Edutopia 
 NPR 
 CNN

External links
Out Teach's Website

Educational organizations based in the United States